Cedonia (pronounced sĕh-dōn-ya) is a very small unincorporated community in Stevens County, Washington, United States.  Formerly a town, it lies in the valley of the Columbia River, on the western slope of hills known as Summit Mines, at a river section known as Lake Roosevelt, a reservoir created by Grand Coulee Dam. Washington State Route 25 is the primary transportation arterial in the community.

The area surrounding it is primarily a farming and ranching community with some logging activity.  Cedonia comprises the Ye Olde Country Store, a veterinary clinic, and seven homes.  There are a few farms surrounding it, and The Cedonia Community Church lies just outside the city limits.  The church tends to be seen as the focal point of the community, hosting many community events as well as events from neighboring communities.  The church is also the source of the name Cedonia.  When it was built in 1897, the settlers searched for a name for their community.  They settled on the name Cedonia, a shortened version of Macedonia from the plea to the apostle Paul in Acts Ch. 16 vs. 9 that says, "Come over here to Macedonia and help us."

Education services are provided by Columbia High School in Hunters, Washington, about 3 miles due south of Cedonia.

Huckleberry Mountain of the Selkirk Mountains rise to the east of the community and the Kettle River Range of the Monashee Mountains lie across the Columbia River from Cedonia.

References

External links
http://www.mapquest.com/maps?city=Cedonia&state=WA

Unincorporated communities in Washington (state)
Unincorporated communities in Stevens County, Washington
Populated places established in 1897
Washington (state) populated places on the Columbia River